Tengo fe en ti (English: I Believe in You) is a 1940 American Spanish language drama film. It was released on July 7, 1940. It was the only production of Victoria Films, which was run by Melville Shauer, who also co-produced the film and was the husband of the film's star, Rosita Moreno. Directed by John Reinhardt, the film also stars José Crespo and Romualdo Tirado.

Cast list
 Rosita Moreno as Anna Tabor/María Ratyani
 José Crespo as Rodolfo Rey
 Romualdo Tirado as León León
 Frank Puglia as Enrico Buriani

References

External links
 
 

American drama films
1940 drama films
1940 films
American black-and-white films
Spanish-language American films
1940s American films